Fianga Airport  is a public use airport located near Fianga, Mayo-Kebbi Est, Chad.

See also
List of airports in Chad

References

External links 
 Airport record for Fianga Airport at Landings.com

Airports in Chad
Mayo-Kebbi Est Region